Sparke is a surname. Notable people with the surname include:

Arthur Sparke, lawyer and politician
Bowyer Sparke, bishop
Edward Sparke, clergyman
John Sparke (died 1566) English MP for Plympton Erle
John Sparke (died 1640) English MP for Mitchell
John Sparke (died 1680) English MP for Plymouth
Joseph Sparke, antiquary
Linda Sparke, astronomer
Penny Sparke, writer and academic
Philip Sparke, composer
Thomas Sparke, clergyman
Thomas Sparke (bishop)

See also
Spark (disambiguation)
Sparkes